Fascia is a comune (municipality) in the Metropolitan City of Genoa in the Italian region Liguria, located about  northeast of Genoa.

The town is located on the slopes of the Monte Carmo, which separates the Trebbia and Borbera valleys. The municipality borders the following municipalities: Carrega Ligure, Fontanigorda, Gorreto, Montebruno, Propata, Rondanina, Rovegno.

See also
 Parco naturale regionale dell'Antola

References

External links
 Official website

Cities and towns in Liguria